Newtown Township, also referred to by the name of its post office of Newtown Square, is a township in Delaware County, Pennsylvania. Prior to 1789 it was part of Chester County.  As of the 2020 United States Census, the population was 15,002.

History
The first mention of the township was in 1684, when Thomas Norbury and John Humphrey were appointed collectors of the "Levie for the cort house and Prison for ye Township of Newtowne". Newtown Square was the name used for the townstead with the majority of early settlers being Welshmen. These Welsh "Friends" (Quakers) needed a road to facilitate their journey to meeting, the only established road at the time being Newtown Street Road, which ran north and south. As such, in 1687, an east–west road was laid out (Goshen Road) so the Friends could attend either Goshen or the Haverford Friends Meeting. By 1696, these friends had become numerous enough to hold their own meeting in Newtown and continued to meet in a private home until the completion of the Newtown Square Friends Meetinghouse in 1711. In the 18th century, Newtown was basically a farming community. Blacksmith and wheelwright shops emerged on the main arteries to service horse and buggy travelers. Taverns and inns were also opened to accommodate local patrons as well as drovers taking their livestock to the markets in Philadelphia.

During the Revolutionary War, Newtown township was visited several times by foraging parties of the British Army. On Goshen Road, west of Newtown Square, were the outpost and headquarters of General Potter.

During the 19th century a number of mills sprang up along Crum Creek (the western border) and Darby Creek (in the northeast corner of the Township).  These included saw mills, paper mills, shingle mills, and a woolen factory. In the Darby Creek area a number of tenement houses were built as well as a general store to service the needs of the mill workers.

In 1860, the population of Newtown Township was 830; the population of Philadelphia was approximately half a million.  At this time, the railroad was laying track out of Philadelphia in all directions with services to Chester, Media, West Chester, and Radnor, but not Newtown Square. As these towns, as well as stops along the way, grew and prospered, mills closed and businesses declined in Newtown Square. By 1890, the population had fallen to 648.

As an agricultural community, stone farmhouses graced the country landscape throughout the 19th century. Additions were made to the early simple dwellings as families grew and more living space was required. Prosperity, due to a growing market, also enabled property owners to make additions, not only to their own homes, but on the property as well as in the form of tenements and outbuildings.

In 1859, the Rose Tree Hunt Club was organized south of the township, followed by the Lima Hunt Club to the west (1885) and the Radnor Hunt Club at the intersection of Darby-Paoli and Goshen Roads in 1886.  With these developments, many country estates were built in the rolling hills of Newtown Square for "either country gentlemen of Old Quaker blood ... or rich Philadelphians who loved hunting, owned good horses, and were not afraid to ride them."  Major transportation developments for the Township did not occur until the mid-1890s, when trolley service was opened to Newtown Square.  Before this time, railroad lines had been proposed, but due to a series of reorganizations and competition between companies for rights of way, as of 1892 no track had been laid.  In 1894, however, a mule-drawn service was initiated by the Philadelphia and Delaware County Railroad, with steam dummies used to help out on the hills.  Electrification was completed the following year and the trolley was open from Newtown to Fernwood in 1895.  By 1889, the reorganized Philadelphia and West Chester Traction Company had completed the track to West Chester.

At the turn of the 20th century, the automobile began to disperse the urban populations over the countryside.  The trolleys, along with automobiles transformed the country farmers into suburban commuters.  Farms were sold and the land subdivided.  Newtown Square boomed.  Many city dwellers retained their country estates; however, these became hidden amidst gridiron developments.  Although construction slackened during the depression, another boom was experienced after World War II.

Some farms and large estates remain, but for the most part, the township was developed into a suburban community with old stone homes and structures dotting the landscape to serve as reminders of days gone by.

Historic sites

Five sites in Newtown are listed on the National Register of Historic Places:
Hood Octagonal School (1842) – the last eight-sided one-room school house in Delaware County. Located on West Chester Pike on the grounds of Dunwoody Village.
Bartram's Covered Bridge (1860) – the last remaining covered bridge in Delaware County (spanning Crum Creek – connecting with Chester County), located at Goshen and Boot roads. Restored in 1996.
Old. St. David's Church (1715) – the oldest non-Quaker church in Delaware County, founded by Welsh Anglicans; burial place of General "Mad" Anthony Wayne, located on S. Valley Forge Road in the very corner of the Township. In March 1880, Henry Wadsworth Longfellow attended the church and wrote the poem "Old St. David's at Radnor".
Square Tavern (1742) – also known as "The Square Inn" and "John West House" – the childhood site of famous American painter Benjamin West, restored in 1981 and again in 2008, located at the corner of Newtown Street Road (Rt. 252) and Goshen Roads
Paper Mill House (1770, 1845) – mill workers' home and general store, restored in the 1980s and  now used as museum and headquarters for the Newtown Square Historical Society. Located at St. David's and Paper Mill Roads.

Government
Newtown is classified as a second class township, having a Board of Supervisors of five members. Supervisors are elected at large by the all registered voting residents of the town for overlapping six-year terms. The board sets policies for the municipality given under the Pennsylvania Second Class Township Code. The current board consists of Chair Leonard B. Altieri, III, Esq., Vice Chair Christina Roberts Lightcap, Supervisor Edward Partridge, Supervisor Mike Russo, and Supervisor Kathryn V. Chandless, Esq..

Appointed boards and commissions include the Bartram Bridge Joint Preservation Commission (Jointly operated with Willistown Township, each with 3 commissioners), Environmental Advisory Council, Leisure Services Commission (jointly operated with Marple Township), Library Board, Municipal Authority (Sewer), Parks and Recreation Board, Planning Commission, Zoning Hearing Board, Strategic Plan Advisory Committee, Shade Tree Commission, Finance Committee, Trails and Greenways Committee, and Historical Preservation Committee. 

Appointed officials are hired by the Board of Supervisors as employees to carry out the decisions of the Board. These bipartisan officials include the Township Manager, who is the Chief Administrative Officer and Treasurer of the township, a position currently held by Stephen Nease. Other appointed officials include Township Solicitor, Richard Sokorai, Township Engineer, Eric Johnson P.E, and Sewage Enforcement Officer, Jamie MacCombie.

Demographics

As of the 2020 census, 14,369 residents identified themselves as one race alone, 13,200 as White (87.98%), 259 as African American (1.72%), 14 as Native American or Alaska Native (0.09%), 792 as Asian (5.28%), 3 as Native Hawaiian and Other Pacific Islander (0.02%), 101 as from other races (0.67%), and 633 from two or more races (4.21%) As of 2010, Hispanic or Latino of any race were 1.2% of the population.

As of the census of 2000, there were 11,700 people, 4,549 households, and 3,184 families residing in the township.  The population density was 1,166.0 people per square mile (450.4/km2).  There were 4,690 housing units at an average density of 467.4 per square mile (180.5/km2).  The racial makeup of the township was 96.16% White, 0.66% African American, 0.07% Native American, 2.30% Asian, 0.13% from other races, and 0.68% from two or more races. Hispanic or Latino of any race were 0.69% of the population.

There were 4,549 households, out of which 27.6% had children under the age of 18 living with them, 60.4% were married couples living together, 7.2% had a female householder with no husband present, and 30.0% were non-families. 27.2% of all households were made up of individuals, and 15.9% had someone living alone who was 65 years of age or older.  The average household size was 2.50 and the average family size was 3.06.

In the township the population was spread out, with 23.1% under the age of 18, 4.9% from 18 to 24, 24.4% from 25 to 44, 25.6% from 45 to 64, and 21.9% who were 65 years of age or older. The median age was 43 years. For every 100 females, there were 88.9 males.  For every 100 females age 18 and over, there were 83.2 males.

The median income for a household in the township was $65,924, and the median income for a family was $82,557. Males had a median income of $61,688 versus $37,319 for females. The per capita income for the township was $39,364.  About 1.8% of families and 3.5% of the population were below the poverty line, including 2.6% of those under age 18 and 3.9% of those age 65 or over.

Geography
Its villages include Echo Valley, Florida Park, Larchmont (also in Marple Township,) Newtown Square, and Wyola.

Adjacent municipalities
 Radnor Township – northeast
 Marple Township – southeast
 Upper Providence Township – south
 Edgmont Township – southwest
 Willistown Township, Chester County – west
 Easttown Township, Chester County – northwest

Waterways in Newtown township include Crum Creek and Darby Creek.  The township is bordered by Springton Lake to the south.

Climate
Newtown Township has a hot-summer humid continental climate (Dfa) and the hardiness zone is 7a.

Transportation

The main east–west road in Newtown Township is Pennsylvania Route 3, which follows West Chester Pike and heads west to West Chester and east to Philadelphia. The main north–south road in Newtown Township is Pennsylvania Route 252, which follows Newtown Street Road and heads south to Media and north to Paoli. Routes 3 and 252 meet in Newtown Square.

SEPTA provides Suburban Bus service to Newtown Township along Route 104, which follows West Chester Pike through the township on its route between West Chester and 69th Street Transportation Center in Upper Darby; Route 112, which follows Media Line Road in the eastern part of the township on its route between Delaware County Community College and the 69th Street Transportation Center; Route 115, which offers weekday service along Media Line Road on its route between Delaware Community College and the Darby Transportation Center in Darby and the Philadelphia International Airport; Route 118, which heads south from Newtown Square along Newtown Street Road to Media and the Chester Transportation Center in Chester; and Route 120, which follows West Chester Pike through the township on its route between Cheyney University and the 69th Street Transportation Center.

Newtown Township was formerly served by the Newtown Square Branch of the Pennsylvania Railroad; rail service to Newtown Square ended in 1963 and the tracks were removed in 1985. The Route 104 bus replaced a trolley service that connected West Chester to Philadelphia along the West Chester Pike between 1898 and the 1950s.

Arts and culture
Places of worship include St. David's Episcopal Church, directly split on the border of Newtown and Radnor Townships, whose graveyard and buildings begin in 1715, are listed on the National Register of Historic Places.  The graveyard contains one of the graves of Revolutionary War hero General Mad Anthony Wayne.  The Newtown Square Friends Meeting House and Burying Ground is the oldest place of worship in Newtown.  The original Quaker settlers built the Meeting House in 1711, and then it was greatly expanded and "modernized" in 1791. The architectural ghost of the original 1711 doorway and one of the original windows can be seen in the stone infill in the north wall of the expanded Meeting House. The Meeting House is still in use for worship on "First Day". Saint Anastasia Parish was founded in 1912 to serve the small Catholic population.  In 1930, a Catholic school was opened. Post-World War II, the church and school expanded to serve the rapidly growing Catholic population of Newtown Square.

Education

Newtown Township lies within the Marple Newtown School District together with Marple Township. The district has four elementary schools, one middle school, and one high school. Culbertson Elementary School is the only one of the four elementary Schools which serves residents of and resides in Newtown Township. Marple Newtown Senior High School lies within township borders on Media Line Rd..

Numerous private and parochial schools are located within Newtown Township, such as Episcopal Academy and Delaware County Christian School.

The township is served by the Newtown Public Library.

Economy

The township is home to the Project Management Institute (PMI), a Lyondell Chemical Company Technology Center, and Apple Leisure Group, which also includes AMResorts and Apple Vacations.

The headquarters of SAP America, a subsidiary of SAP SE, is located in Newtown. SAP America has around 3,000 employees in the area. SAP America has around 19,300 employees in United States.

Attractions 
The Newtown Square Railroad Museum is located inside of the former Pennsylvania Railroad's Newtown Square Station and features a small model train layout, a former Red Arrow trolley, a vintage steam locomotive, and various other artifacts preserving the history of the Newtown Square Branch.

In Popular Culture 
The Du Pont Foxcatcher Farm estate was located in Newtown. Following John Du Pont's murder of Olympic wrestler Dave Schultz in 1996, Du Pont was arrested by the Newtown Township Police Department. The events were made into the 2014 film Foxcatcher.

Aronimink Golf Club is located within Newtown Square. The course is considered one of the nation's top golf courses. The club hosted the 1962 PGA Championship, 1977 U.S. Amateur Championship, 1997 U.S. Junior Amateur Championship, 2003 Senior PGA Championship, the 2010 and 2011 AT&T National, the 2018 BMW Championship, 2020 Women's PGA Championship, and is set to host the 2026 PGA Championship.

Notable Residents 
Those of note who were born or once lived in Newtown.

 Michael Barkann (resident): Sports host, anchor and reporter for NBC Sports Philadelphia.
 Smedley Butler (resident): U.S. Marine Corps, two-time Medal of Honor recipient and anti-war activist. Lived in Newtown upon his retirement until his death.
 Pat Chambers (born): College basketball coach. Head coach of men's basketball team at Florida Gulf Coast. Former head coach at Penn State and Boston University.
 Joey Crawford (resident): Basketball referee for NBA (1977-2016).
 John Du Pont (resident): Convicted murderer and philanthropist. Hier to the Du Pont family and murderer of Olympian wrestler David Schultz.
 Rajiv L. Gupta (resident): Indian-American businessman, chairman of Aptiv, former executive of Rohm and Haas.
 Cole Hamels (resident c. 2014-2021): Professional baseball pitcher for the Philadelphia Phillies (2006-2015), Texas Rangers (2015-2018), Chicago Cubs (2018-2019), and Atlanta Braves (2020).
 Willem Johan Kolff (resident): Dutch-American inventor, pioneer of hemodialysis, artificial heart, and artificial organs. Lived in Newtown from his retirement in 1996 until his death.
 Bill Maas (born): Former American football defensive tackle for the Kansas City Chiefs (1984-1992) and the Green Bay Packers (1993).
 Sean Payton (resident): American football head coach, currently for the Denver Broncos. Lived in Newtown from 1970-1978 during elementary and middle school.
 Frederic Pryor (resident): Economist and professor at Swarthmore College. Imprisoned in East Berlin in 1961 for 6 months until released in a "spy swap". Lived in Newtown from 2008 until his death in 2019.
 Benjamin West (resident): British-American artist, painter of works such as The Death of Nelson, The Death of General Wolfe, the Treaty of Paris, and Benjamin Franklin Drawing Electricity from the Sky. West grew up in Newtown, his father, John West, was the proprietor of the square tavern.

References

External links

Newtown Township
Newtown Township @DelawareCountyPA.com
Newtown Square Historical Society

Townships in Delaware County, Pennsylvania
Townships in Pennsylvania
1684 establishments in Pennsylvania